Bramble, During the Summer is a Russian film produced in 2006. It was based on the novel "Kostya nickname The Tale" by the well-known children's writer Tamara Kryukova, who is writing fiction for teenagers.

Cast 

  Olga Starchenkova - Nika
  Ivan Vakulenko - Kostya
  Lyubov Germanova - Paulina
  Vladimir Simonov - Rodion Victorovich, father of Nicka
  Anna Churina - Anastasia
  Anna Gulyarenko - mother of Kostya
  Anna Zdor - Verka

Crew 

 Director: Dmitry Fyodorov
 Written by: Leo Deltsov
 Operator: Ivan Gudkov
 Artist: Oleg Kramorenko
 Composer: Andrew Doinikov
 Produced by: Vitaly Sidorenko, Timur Abdullaev

Awards 

  2006 - Grand Prix at the XIV International Children's Film Festival "Artek".
  2006 - The prize for best costumes to the film at the XIV International Children's Film Festival "Artek".
  2006 - Grand Prix at the X All-Russia festival "Eaglet or Orlenok"
  2006 - Grand Prix at the I Moscow Open Festival of Youth Cinema "Reflection or Otrajene."
  2006 - Grand Prix at the VI International Children's Festival of Arts "Kinotavrik" in Sochi.
  2007 - Award for contribution to the revival of spiritual and moral foundations of family, traditional Russian foundations at the II International Sretensky Orthodox Festival "Meeting" in Obninsk.

References

External links 

  During the summer " on site "Cinemas of Russia"
  During the summer " on RusKino.ru
  During the summer " at Kinotheatre site.
  Interview with the director of "bramble" Dmitry Fyodorov and implementing major roles.
 The book "Kostya nickname The Tale" site author Tamara Kryukova.
 The book "Kostya nickname The Tale" at amazon.com.

Russian romance films
2006 films
2000s romance films